'Weaponization of everything' is a phrase referring to an expansion of the definition of what a weapon is, and correspondingly the expansion of what constitutes a threat, attack, and defense. This expansion or increase in distribution makes it harder to identify what a (threat) attack (or defense) is. The phrase when taken to an extreme means that every individual or group of people will be able to affect the security of every other individual or group of people. Between its reality and its theoretical conceptualization is a gap implying that the world has not exhausted its opportunities for security. The phrase also implies understanding to what extent something can be weaponized. This results in the identification of how war can be waged through other means, including less violent means.

The history of war makes it clear that the underlying concept is not new; however the scope of "everything" changes. The phrase has been compared to the law of the instrument; when all you know is how to attack, everything will be used as a weapon, and to the 'enemy' everything will feel like a weapon, and everything will be used as a defense.

See also 

 Outline of war#Types of war
 Hybrid warfare
 Grey-zone
 No war, no peace
 Competition
 Gerasimov doctrine
 Unrestricted warfare
 Three warfares
 Information warfare
 Asymmetric warfare
 Reflexive control

References

Bibliography 

 
 

Weapons
Warfare